Willow Canyon is a census-designated place in Pima County, in the U.S. state of Arizona. The population was "S" (Seasonal) at the 2010 census.

Geography
The community is an area of cabins within the Coronado National Forest, north of Tucson on the Catalina Highway.

Demographics

References

Census-designated places in Pima County, Arizona
Census-designated places in Arizona